EViews is a statistical package for Windows, used mainly for time-series oriented econometric analysis. It is developed by Quantitative Micro Software (QMS), now a part of IHS. Version 1.0 was released in March 1994, and replaced MicroTSP. The TSP software and programming language had been originally developed by Robert Hall in 1965. The current version of EViews is 13, released in August 2022.

Features
EViews can be used for general statistical analysis and econometric analyses, such as cross-section and panel data analysis and time series estimation and forecasting.

EViews combines spreadsheet and relational database technology with the traditional tasks found in statistical software, and uses a Windows GUI. This is combined with a programming language which displays limited object orientation.

The Enterprise edition of EViews allows access to 3rd party time series data from multiple providers including: Thomson Reuters Datastream, Moody's Economy.com, Macrobond Financial, Haver Analytics, and CEIC.

Data formats
EViews relies heavily on a proprietary and undocumented file format for data storage. However, for input and output it supports numerous formats, including databank format, Excel formats, PSPP/SPSS, DAP/SAS, Stata, RATS, and TSP. EViews can access ODBC databases. EViews file formats can be partially opened by gretl.

Stationarity of data
EViews helps researchers detect unit roots in their data series. Multiple unit root tests are available in the research software, including Dickey–Fuller, Phillips–Perron, Kwiatkowski–Phillips–Schmidt–Shin and Elliott, Rothenberg and Stock Point-Optimal tests.

Estimation
EViews helps researchers and professionals to estimate linear equations and systems of linear equations models of time series and panel data with various methods. Eviews allows the user to assess econometric results easily.

See also

 Comparison of statistical packages
 Gretl
 GNU Octave
 Matlab
 R
 SAS
 Scilab
 SPSS
 Stata

References

Further reading

External links
 

1994 software
Econometrics software
Time series software
Windows-only software